King Street Junior is a radio comedy which was broadcast on BBC Radio 4 between March 1985 and November 1998. The show ran for ten series and the cast included Peter Davison, James Grout and Karl Howman. The series is written by Jim Eldridge.

Research for the show was done at Newtown Road School in Carlisle.

A continuation series aired in 2002 and was named King Street Junior Revisited.

Episodes closed with a children's choir singing "See the Farmer Sow the Seed," a hymn written by Baptist minister Frederick Arthur Jackson (1867-1942).

Cast
 Peter Davison as Mr. Eric Brown (Series one and two)
 James Grout as Mr. Harry Beeston
 Karl Howman as Mr. Philip Sims (From series three onwards)
 Tom Watson as Mr. Fred Holliday
 Margaret John as Mrs. Dorothy Stone
 Vivienne Martin as Mrs. Lillian Rudd
 Paul Copley as Mr. Geoff Long
 Marlene Sidaway as Miss. Glenda Lewis
 Deirdre Costello as Mrs. Yvonne Patterson

Episodes

Series 1
Broadcast in 1985

All episodes written by Jim Eldridge

 The New School Year Starts Here
 Redeployment
 Crime And Punishment
 The Principle Of The Thing
 Scale Points
 Language Units
 Christmas At King Street

Series 2
Broadcast in 1987

 Priorities
 Dispute
 Barn Dance
 Problem Parents
 The Sound Of Music
 Assemblies
 Parents' Evening
 The Outing
 Sports Day
 Breaking Up Is Hard To Do

Series 3
Broadcast in 1988. Peter Davison's character is no longer in the show, having taken a position at another school; from here on is Karl Howman as Philip Sims.

 Back To School
 Fireworks
 The Spirit Of Christmas
 The History Game
 Pressures
 Facts Of Life
 Under Canvas
 The School Fete

Series 4

 It's Only Rock'n'Roll
 Closure
 Opting Out
 Fundraising
 Health
 The Succession
 It's Not Cricket
 That Old Time Religion

Series 5
Broadcast in 1990

 D-Day Minus One
 Is This A Career I See Before Me?
 Good Times, Bad Times
 Choices
 Bon Voyage
 Work
 The Reunion

Series 6

 In Real Terms
 Travellers
 Safety First
 A Good Read
 Emergency
 A Day At The Centre
 Thursday's Child
 The Games Children Play

Series 7
Broadcast in 1992

Back In The Jug Again
Witch Hunt
Is There A Father Christmas?
Fatal Attraction
Horses For Courses
Beside The Seaside
Taking The Rap
Endings & Beginnings

Series 8
Back after a few years in 1995

 Mr Chips - by Paul Copley
 Settling In
 Beginnings & Endings
 Left Out, Roped In
 Confusion - by Richard Stoneman
 Internal Enquiries

Series 9
Responsibilities by Richard Stoneman
Danger Zone by Jim Eldridge
A Bridge To Afar by Paul Copley
Relative Value by Andy Rashleigh
With Love by Jim Eldridge
Crossed Lines Richard Stoneman
Financial Times by Paul Copley
Gridlocked by Jim Eldridge

Series 10
Broadcast in 1998

Proposals
The Rivals
Accusations
Target Practice
Incidental Music
Final Thoughts

Broadcast History
For most of its run, it was broadcast in Radio 4's lunchtime comedy slot at 12.27, with later series moving to a morning broadcast. Repeats have also been aired on BBC Radio 7 and BBC Radio 4 Extra.

Critical Reception
The series was described as follows:

Multimedia
The ten series of the show are published by Penguin and available to purchase at Audible.

Book
Jim Eldridge, who created the show and wrote 87 episodes, also wrote a 2006 book, King Street Junior – The Inside Story, describing the history of the show including the behind-the-scenes conflicts.

References

External links
 British Comedy & Drama Guide
 British Comedy Guide

BBC Radio comedy programmes
1985 radio programme debuts
BBC Radio 4 programmes